Proștea may refer to one of two places in Sibiu County, Romania:

Proștea, the former name of Stejărișu village, Iacobeni Commune
Proștea Mare, the former name of Târnava Commune